Blackadder Water is a river in Berwickshire in the Scottish Borders area of Scotland, forming part of the River Tweed system. It reached 2.84m at Mouthbridge, which was its highest level ever recorded on Tuesday 22 October 2002 at 2:45pm.

Etymology
Adder may be derived from Brittonic *ador, *edir or Old English edre, possible ancient hydronymic terms derived from an Indo-European formation meaning "a watercourse, a channel" (compare River Etherow). From the possible Old English derivation of ǣdre, "a vein" (Anglian ēdre), or *ǣdre, meaning "quickly", arise objections on the basis that these would have maintained the long initial vowel in English and Scots.

Also suggested is derivation from Gaelic fad dûr, meaning "long water".

Course
Rising in the Harecleugh Forest plantation just south of the Twin Law cairns, north of the village of Westruther, the headwaters of the Blackadder join with those of the Wedderlie, Edgar, and Fangrist Burns, before reaching the town of Greenlaw. The river proceeds in a meandering path through the Merse until it meets with the Langton Burn between the estates of Kimmerghame House and Wedderburn Castle. The Blackadder later becomes a tributary of the Whiteadder Water and joins with that river at the village of Allanton, where Blackadder House and its estate once stood.

The Whiteadder then crosses the English Border below Edrington where it joins the Tweed which empties into the North Sea at Berwick-upon-Tweed.

See also
List of rivers of Scotland
List of places in the Scottish Borders
List of places in Scotland

References

External links
RCAHMS record of Blackadder Water
RCAHMS/Canmore record of Fogo Bridge
Gazetteer for Scotland: Blackadder Water
Streetmap of Blackadder Water

Rivers of the Scottish Borders
Tributaries of the River Tweed
2Blackadder